Gintas K (real name Gintas Kraptavicius; born 1969) is a sound artist born in Lithuania in 1969. He was the core member of the first Lithuanian industrial music group "Modus". Performances, actions, even short films shape the activities of "Modus" (which is translated as "the way of life").

Later Gintas Kraptavicius was active as a performer and interdisciplinary artist, known for his actions, happenings, written instructions in a post-fluxus manner.

In 1999 Gintas turned his scenery name into Gintas K and started exploring experimental,    electroacoustic, electronic, computer music, granular synthesis, live electronic music aesthetics. Since 2011 member of Lithuanian Composers Union. 
Till now he has released 34 albums, took part in various international festivals, conferences, symposiums as transmediale.05 : Basics, transmediale.07 : Unfinish!, ISEA 2015: Disruption, IRCAM Forum Workshop 2017, ICMC2018, ICMC2022, ICMC-NYCEMF 2019 , NYCEMF 2020 , Ars Electronica Festival 2020 , NYCEMF 2021 , NYCEMF 2022 . Winner of the II International Sound-Art Contest Broadcasting Art 2010, Spain. Winner of The University of South Florida New-Music Consortium  2019 International Call for Scores in electronic composition category.

Discography

Albums
2003 o)o(o 
2003 //// 
2003 without out (live @ garso zona) 
2004 Taip Taip 
2004 titled# 
2006 Jamaika 
2006 Lengvai / 60 x one-minute audio colours of 2kHz sound   
 2007 13 Tracks 
 2007 Elementary Particles  
2009 Lovely Banalities 
2009 Frozen Time 
2010 So On 
2011 The live that never have been played live 
2012 Gintas K
2013 ffff (unpublished album 2005)
2013 works 2006-2008 
2013 Slow
2013 Greit
2013 NOTA DEMO
2014 pOpXEnA
2014 Blind Man Tales
2014 Minerva or Anything Goes
2015 i will tell you 3 things / an easy listening album
2015 Love Is Love
2015 Message in a Bottle
2015 jesus safe my soul 
2016 Lives
2016 Low
2016 Dimensions
2017 Under my Skin
2017 2014
2018 Acousma Light
2019 M
2019 One Day Journey
2019 Variations in a-moll for a granular synthesis
2020 Amnesia
2020 Extensions
2020 Sound & Spaces
2021 The Ways
2021 Art Brut 
2021 Nervus Vagus 
2022 Lėti 
2022 Mountains, runlets, caves & cascades 
2022 Jingles With Bells  
2023 Resonances 
2023 Towards Calm Ecstasy

Collaborations
2008 Robertas Kundrotas & Gintas K - Septyni Tiltai Pasaulio Centre 
2009 Gintas K & GYS - when the drummer is smoking 
2013 GINTAS K/DAVID ELLIS/SIMON TYSZKO 
2014 Richard Crow & Gintas K - Unburied Evidence 
2016  Travis Johnson & Gintas K - studies
2017  Gintas K & Roomet Jakapi - i will loose it
2018  Travis Johnson & Gintas K - Into the Void 
2020  Portraitzine issue Gintas K 
2020  Gintas K and KAZUYA ISHIGAMI split 
2020  Gintas K & Jukka-Pekka Kervinen - Pop Will Generate Itself
2021  “Two K” - Jan Kruml's & Gintas Kraptavičius - Environmental Framework  
2021 Live at Noise=Noise by Richard Crow & Gintas K 2014 
2022 Sorry Gold by GINTAS K & MICHELLE O'ROURKE
2023 Gintas K & Zan Hoffman - Bunny Tales
2023 flux remix with Kommissar Hjuler & Mama Baer, Psych.KG (D)
2023 haunted remix with Kommissar Hjuler & Mama Baer, Psych.KG (D)

Visual project
 2000 Less and Less Stars Every Year
 2005 Gimimo diena
 2014 August Strindberg. THE CREDITORS

Sources

Interviews
 theQ:: is based on the original Questionnaire of Marcel Proust GINTAS KRAPTAVIČIUS  2022/08/20
 Gintas Kraptavičius: „Mano muzikos misija? OMG – aišku pakeisti pasaulį!“  2021/05/10
 Interview in Lietuvos muzikos antena March 1h, 2019 
 Interview in Lietuvos muzikos antena April 24h, 2018 
 Interview in LMIC September 24h, 2015 
 Interview in infinite grain, dialogue 03: gintas k June 30th, 2014 
 Interview in Chain D.L.K. 2013 
 Interview in radikaliai.lt
 Interview in ore.lt
 Interview in delfi.lt
 Interview in bernardinai.lt 2006 
 Interview in New Media Art Project Network 2006

Reviews
 Review in geiger.dk 
 Review in PHOSPHOR 
 Review in Wreck This Mess 
 Review in Monochrom.at

External links
 Official Website 
 Modus 
 Sound Work

1969 births
Living people
Interdisciplinary artists
Lithuanian electronic musicians